Kusunda may refer to:

 Kusunda people, an ethnic group in western Nepal
 Kusunda language, their language

Language and nationality disambiguation pages